"Ein Lämmlein geht und trägt die Schuld" is a Lutheran hymn relating to the Passion of Christ. The title may also refer to various compositions:
"Ein Lämmlein geht und trägt die Schuld", BWV 267, four-part chorale by Johann Sebastian Bach
Ein Lämmlein geht und trägt die Schuld, GraunWV B:VII:4, Passion cantata by Carl Heinrich Graun
Ein Lämmlein geht und trägt die Schuld, GWV 1119/24, a cantata for Estomihi (last Sunday before lent) by Christoph Graupner
Ein Lämmlein geht und trägt die Schuld, HoWV 1.2, Passion cantata by Gottfried August Homilius
Ein Lämmlein geht und trägt die Schuld, HoWV 1.3, a.k.a. St Matthew Passion, by Gottfried August Homilius
Ein Lämmlein geht und trägt die Schuld (Stölzel), a.k.a. Die leidende und am Creutz sterbende Liebe Jesu, a Passion oratorio by Gottfried Heinrich Stölzel
Ein Lämmlein geht und trägt die Schuld, TWV 5:8, St Mark Passion by Georg Philipp Telemann
Ein Lämmlein geht und trägt die Schuld, TWV 5:30, St John Passion by Georg Philipp Telemann
Ein Lämmlein geht und trägt die Schuld, TWV 5:51, St Matthew Passion by Georg Philipp Telemann